The women's tournament was one of two handball tournaments at the 1984 Summer Olympics. It was the third appearance of a women's handball tournament at the Olympic Games.

Results

Summary

References

Women's tournament
Women's events at the 1984 Summer Olympics